The 1932 Thuringia state election was held on 31 July 1932 to elect the 61 members of the Landtag of Thuringia.

Results

References 

Thuringia
Elections in Thuringia
July 1932 events